Bertram A. Goodman (1904–1988) was an American artist.

He studied at the School of American Sculpture, and at the Art Students League of New York in 1925.
He was a member of the Federal Art Project whose murals included, Evolution of the Book, at Theodore Roosevelt High School, murals at Washington Avenue and Fordham Road in the Bronx as well as Quaker Settlers in Quakertown, Pennsylvania 
 
He was Director of the Artists Equity Association from 1955 to 1956.
His work is in the Brooklyn Museum and Albright-Knox Art Gallery.

References

External links
The Evolution of Tools, painting, and biography from Butler Institute of American Art
These My Jewels, painting
Men with Mannikin, painting
Christie's 1992 sale of The Evolution of Tools

1904 births
1988 deaths
American muralists
20th-century American sculptors
20th-century American male artists
American male sculptors
20th-century American painters
American male painters
Federal Art Project artists